Drohobych urban hromada is a hromada (municipality) in Lviv Oblast, in western Ukraine. The hromada's administrative centre is the city of Drohobych.

Until 18 July 2020, the city of Drohobych was designated as a city of oblast significance and belonged to its own municipality, rather than Drohobych Raion, which it also served as the capital of. As part of the administrative reform of Ukraine, which reduced the number of raions of Lviv Oblast to seven, Drohobych became part of Drohobych Raion.

Settlements 
In addition to two cities (Drohobych and Stebnyk), the Drohobych urban hromada is home to 32 villages:

 
 
 
 Novoshychi
 
 Bolekhivtsi
 Nove Selo
 Bronytsia
 
 
 
 
 
 Dolishnii Luzhok
 
 
 
 
 Nahuievychi
 
 
 
 
 Rykhtychi
 
 Sniatynka
 Zaluzhany
 
 Stupnytsia
 
 Selets

References 

2020 establishments in Ukraine
Hromadas of Lviv Oblast